Brit HaBirionim (Hebrew: ברית הבריונים, variously translated as The Strongmen Alliance, Alliance of Thugs, Alliance of the Hoodlums, and The Covenant of the Outlaws) was a clandestine, self-declared fascist faction of the Revisionist Zionist Movement (ZRM) in  Mandatory Palestine, active between  1930 and 1933. It was founded by the trio of Abba Ahimeir, Uri Zvi Greenberg and Yehoshua Yeivin.

History
The 1929 Arab riots and the Haganah's inability to successfully prevent the 1929 Hebron massacre and the Safed massacre led to the creation of the first militant organization characterized by its complete disassociation from the existing Zionist establishment dominated by the Labor Zionist movement. Brit HaBirionim was founded in October 1930 and was right-wing and nationalist in its orientation as opposed to the current of Labor Zionism.

Ideology
The organization's official ideology was Revisionist Maximalism, which was modelled upon Italian Fascism. Italian influence could be seen in the fact that leaders Ahimeir and Greenberg called upon Ze'ev Jabotinsky to become [[Duce|'duce''']]. Similarly, it sought to create a fascist corporatist state. However, it was also influenced by the Canaanite ideology of Yonatan Ratosh, as well as the theories of Oswald Spengler in The Decline of the West (1918). The group also took profound influence from the ancient Jewish Sicarii insurgents.

It called for the Zionist Revisionist Movement (ZRM) to adopt the fascist principles of the regime of Benito Mussolini in Italy to create an integralist "pure nationalism" amongst Jews. Revisionist Maximalism rejects communism, humanism, internationalism, liberalism, pacifism and socialism; condemned liberal Zionists for only working for middle-class Jews rather than the Jewish nation as a whole.Shindler, Colin. The Triumph of Military Zionism: Nationalism and the Origins of the Israeli Right. I.B.Tauris, 2006. p156. Revisionist Maximalism's minimal goals were presented in 1932 where Ahimeir officially called for the leadership of the Zionist Revisionist Movement to be redesigned into the form of a dictatorship, called for the creation of an independent Zionist federation, called for a "war on funds" to end corruption in the Zionist movement, and called for a war on anti-Semitism. The movement's psychology was emphasized in its motto of "conquer or die".

Operations

Members of Brit HaBirionim'' carried out several operations, including demonstrations against visiting British dignitaries, rallies against the British arrest and deportation to Europe of Jewish refugees who overstayed their tourist visas, attempts to interrupt a census conducted by the British, and other illegal activities intended as public provocations such as blowing the Shofar at the Western Wall (forbidden to Jews at that time), and removing the Nazi flags from two German consulates.

In 1933, the British Mandatory Authority arrested several members, including Ahimeir, and charged them with the murder of Chaim Arlosoroff. Though acquitted of the charges in 1934, the trial tarnished the group's reputation and led to its isolation by former political supporters among the Jewish populace, and eventually to its demise.

Many of the group's adherents would later become members of Irgun and Lehi.

References

See also
Assassination of Haim Arlosoroff

1930 establishments in Mandatory Palestine
Far-right politics in Israel
Fascist organizations
1933 disestablishments in Mandatory Palestine
Organizations established in 1930
Organizations disestablished in 1933
Jewish fascists
Revisionist Zionism